John Brownlee may refer to:
 John Brownlee (baritone) (1900–1969), Australian opera singer
 John Brownlee (basketball), retired American basketball player
 John Brownlee (statistician) (1868–1927), British statistician
 John Edward Brownlee (1883–1961), Canadian politician, former Premier of Alberta
 John L. Brownlee (born 1965), United States attorney and politician
 Jonny Brownlee (born 1990), British triathlete
 Johnathan Brownlee, film producer

See also
 John Brownlie (born 1952), Scottish footballer